The Mayor of Christchurch is the head of the municipal government of Christchurch, New Zealand, and presides over the Christchurch City Council.  The mayor is directly elected using a First Past the Post electoral system. The current mayor, Phil Mauger, was elected in the 2022 mayoral election. The current deputy mayor is Pauline Cotter.

Christchurch was initially governed by the chairman of the town council. In 1868, the chairman became the city council's first mayor as determined by his fellow city councillors. Since 1875, the mayor is elected by eligible voters and, after an uncontested election, the first election was held in the following year.

History

Chairmen of the Town Council

Christchurch became a city by Royal charter on 31 July 1856; the first in New Zealand. Since 1862, chairmen were in charge of local government. Five chairmen presided in the initial years:

Mayors of the City Council

The town council held a meeting on 10 June 1868 to elect its first mayor. In those days, councillors were elected for three-year terms, and once a year elected one of their group as mayor, i.e. the position was not elected at large (by the voting public) as is the case today.

The following councillors attended the 10 June meeting: William Wilson, James Purvis Jameson, T. Tombs, George Ruddenklau, Henry Thomson, W. A. Sheppard, William Calvert and John Anderson, who chaired the meeting. Thomson moved that Wilson be elected as the first mayor of Christchurch, and Tombs seconded the motion. The chairman put the motion to the meeting and it was carried unanimously. With the meeting, the council had brought itself under the Municipal Corporations Act 1867.

Hence, the last chairman (William Wilson) became the first mayor in 1868. The first chairman (John Hall) became mayor 44 years later in 1906. There have been 46 holders of the position. The longest-serving was Sir Hamish Hay, who held the post for 15 years (5 terms). The shortest mayoralty was by Tommy Taylor in 1911, who died three months after being elected. Wilson's term, at just over six months, was the second shortest. Vicki Buck and Lianne Dalziel, have been the only female mayors so far.

Initially, councillors elected one of their own as mayor towards the end of the year, and the role was usually awarded to the most senior councillor. Most elections were unanimous, and the newly elected mayor was instantly regarded as the head of the council. The system changed with the introduction of The Municipal Corporations Acts Amendment Act, 1875, as that legislation stipulated that mayors had to be elected at large (i.e. by eligible voters). Fred Hobbs, the incumbent, was the only candidate nominated, so he was declared elected unopposed on 17 December 1875. James Gapes was the first mayor elected at large on 20 December 1876. The newly elected person was from that point the mayor-elect, until he was sworn in; Gapes was sworn in on 2 January 1877. Despite this, Taylor's death in 1911 resulted in councillors electing their fellow councillor John Joseph Dougall as mayor as required by the legislation for such cases.

Mayors were initially appointed and then elected for one year; elections started following the Municipal Corporations Act of 1876. This was changed to biennial elections "on the last Wednesday in April" with the Municipal Corporations Amendment Act, 1913. The act came into force in March 1915 and thus first applied at the April 1915 mayoral election. The Municipal Corporations Act, 1933 changed the mayoral term to three years, and this commenced with the 1935 mayoral election.

Five mayors have held non-consecutive terms:
 James Gapes
 Walter Cooper
 Charles Louisson
 Charles Gray
 Robert Macfarlane

Recent mayors

Four former mayors are alive:
 Vicki Buck (1989–1998)
 Garry Moore (1998–2007)
 Bob Parker (2007–2013)
 Lianne Dalziel (2013–2022)

List of mayors

List of deputy-mayors of Christchurch

The position of deputy mayor was established in 1917. In the first meeting of the newly elected council on 7 May 1917, Alfred Williams was the first city councillor to be elected to the position. Five deputy-mayors were later elected as mayors: John Beanland, James Flesher, Dan Sullivan, Ernest Andrews, and George Manning. Four deputy-mayors were mayors before they served as deputies: Henry Thacker, John Archer, Robert Macfarlane, and Vicki Buck. Since October 2022, the current deputy mayor is Pauline Cotter, who is representing the Innes ward.

Notes

References

 
Christchurch